Epoch is the fourth studio album by the ambient music project Tycho, released on 30 September 2016 on Ghostly International. It is the final album in a 'trilogy' by the project, beginning in 2011 with Dive and continuing with Awake in 2014.

The album debuted at the top of the Billboard Dance/Electronic Albums chart. The album received generally positive reviews from critics and was nominated for Best Dance/Electronic Album at the 59th Grammy Awards.

Critical reception

Epoch received generally positive reviews from critics, having been assigned a normalized score of 76 from review aggregator Metacritic.

Track listing

Personnel
Credits adapted from the liner notes of Epoch.

 Scott Hansen – producer, guitar, keyboards, bass, drum programming, arrangement, artwork
 Zac Brown – bass, guitar, arrangement
 Rory O'Connor – live drums
 Count – mastering, mixing, production consultant
 Songs 1, 2, 3  live drums recorded by Anthony Gallo at Virtue And Vice Studio
 Additional live drum recording by Peter Franco at Panoramic Studios

Charts

References

2016 albums
Tycho (musician) albums
Ghostly International albums
Instrumental albums